Itaperuna is a municipality in the Brazilian state of Rio de Janeiro. It had a population of 103,800 in 2020, and has an area of 1.105,3 km2.

History

Itaperuna was founded in 1889, after being separated from the municipality of Campos dos Goytacazes.

Location

Itaperuna is located 230 km from the state capital Rio de Janeiro. Its neighbouring municipalities are:

 Bom Jesus do Itabapoana – north, northeast and east
 Campos dos Goytacazes – east
 Italva – east and southeast
 Cambuci – south
 São José de Ubá – south
 Miracema – southwest
 Laje do Muriaé – west
 Patrocínio de Muriaé – northwest
 Eugenópolis - northwest
 Antônio Prado de Minas - northwest

Transportation
The city is served by Ernani do Amaral Peixoto Airport.

References

 
Municipalities in Rio de Janeiro (state)